Michael Flowers may refer to:

 Michael Flowers (basketball) (born 1999), American college basketball player
 Michael C. Flowers, U.S. Army officer
 Mike City (born Michael Flowers), American singer, songwriter and record producer

See also
 The Mike Flowers Pops, a British easy-listening band fronted by Mike Flowers (real name Mike Roberts)